The Melody-Maker is a 1933 British musical comedy film directed by Leslie S. Hiscott and starring Lester Matthews, Joan Marion and Evelyn Roberts . The film was made at Teddington Studios as a quota quickie by the British subsidiary of Warner Brothers.

Cast
Lester Matthews as Tony Borrodaile
Joan Marion as Mary
Evelyn Roberts as Reggie Bumblethorpe
Wallace Lupino as Clamart
A. Bromley Davenport as Jenks
Vera Gerald as Grandma
Joan White as Jerry
Charles Hawtrey as Torn
Toni Edgar-Bruce as Donna Lola

Production
The Melody-Maker was filmed at Warner Brothers First National Studios, Teddington, Middlesex by Warner Brothers First National.

References

External links

1933 films
British musical comedy films
1932 musical comedy films
1930s English-language films
Films directed by Leslie S. Hiscott
Films shot at Teddington Studios
Quota quickies
British black-and-white films
1933 comedy films
1930s British films